NBA Jam 2001 is a sports Game Boy Color game made by Acclaim Entertainment as licensed basketball simulation for the 2001-2002 NBA season. It was the follow-up to NBA Jam 2000. It featured Karl Malone, Jason Williams, Reggie Miller, Jason Kidd, Latrell Sprewell, and Scottie Pippen on the cover.

Reception

The game received "unfavorable" reviews according to the review aggregation website GameRankings.

References

2000 video games
Acclaim Entertainment games
Game Boy Color games
Game Boy Color-only games
NBA Jam
North America-exclusive video games
DC Studios games
Multiplayer and single-player video games
Video games developed in the United States